The Americas Zone was one of three zones of regional competition in the 1998 Fed Cup.

Group I
Venue: Tennis Academy, Brasília, Brazil (outdoor clay)
Date: 14–17 April

The nine teams were first randomly divided into three pools of three teams to compete in round-robin competitions. The nine teams were then divided into three new pools based on their placing in their first pools, which would be used to determine each team's overall placing in the zonal group. The team that finished first overall would be promoted to the World Group II Play-offs, while the teams that finished eighth and ninth would be relegated to Group II for 1999.

Initial Pools

Placement Pools

  advanced to World Group II Play-offs.
  and  relegated to Group II in 1999.

Group II
 Venue: Chipinque Racquet Club, Monterrey, Mexico (outdoor hard)
 Date: 27 April – 3 May

The sixteen teams were divided into two pools of eight. The top team from each pool then moved would advance to Group I for 1999.

Pools

  and  advanced to Group I in 1999.

See also
Fed Cup structure

References

 Fed Cup Profile, Paraguay
 Fed Cup Profile, Canada
 Fed Cup Profile, Colombia
 Fed Cup Profile, Chile
 Fed Cup Profile, Peru
 Fed Cup Profile, Ecuador
 Fed Cup Profile, Mexico
 Fed Cup Profile, El Salvador
 Fed Cup Profile, Haiti
 Fed Cup Profile, Costa Rica
 Fed Cup Profile, Guatemala
 Fed Cup Profile, Barbados
 Fed Cup Profile, Bermuda
 Fed Cup Profile, Puerto Rico
 Fed Cup Profile, Cuba
 Fed Cup Profile, Dominican Republic
 Fed Cup Profile, Bolivia
 Fed Cup Profile, Trinidad and Tobago
 Fed Cup Profile, Panama
 Fed Cup Profile, Jamaica

External links
 Fed Cup website

 
Americas
Sport in Brasília
Tennis tournaments in Brazil
Sport in Monterrey
Tennis tournaments in Mexico
International sports competitions hosted by Mexico
International sports competitions in Brasília
1998 in Mexican tennis
1998 in Brazilian tennis
1998 Fed Cup Americas Zone
1998 Fed Cup Americas Zone